Gen Ueda (born 18 July 1949) is a Japanese equestrian. He competed in two events at the 1976 Summer Olympics.

References

1949 births
Living people
Japanese male equestrians
Olympic equestrians of Japan
Equestrians at the 1976 Summer Olympics
Place of birth missing (living people)
Asian Games medalists in equestrian
Equestrians at the 1982 Asian Games
Asian Games silver medalists for Japan
Medalists at the 1982 Asian Games